The 2022 Women's FA Cup Final was the 52nd final of the Women's FA Cup, England's primary cup competition for women's football teams. The showpiece event was the 28th to be played directly under the auspices of The Football Association (FA) and was named the Vitality Women's FA Cup Final due to sponsorship reasons.

The final was contested between Chelsea and Manchester City on 15 May 2022 at Wembley Stadium in London and broadcast on BBC1. Chelsea won 3–2 after extra time to clinch their fourth title, in front of a competition-record crowd of 49,094.

Match

Details

Notes

References

External links
 
 Report at WomensFACup.co.uk

Cup
Women's FA Cup finals
Women's FA Cup Final
Women's FA Cup Final
FA Women's Cup Final, 2021
FA Women's Cup Final 2022